Nicole Duplaix (born 1943) is a French American zoologist, ecologist, teacher, and photographer who specializes in studying otters.

Biography 
Duplaix first begin working with otters while volunteering at the Bronx Zoo. She earned her master's degree at the University of Paris in 1966 and 1968. She later studied giant otters in South America. Over two years in this study she managed to identify 249 different individuals. She also helped Suriname officials learn how to preserve giant otters, though they still face endangerment there today and in the rest of South America.

She later returned to the University of Paris to complete her PhD. Her 1980 dissertation focused on the giant otters of Suriname's Kaboeri Creek and the phylogeny of the 13 species of otters. She also is a co-founder of TRAFFIC in 1973 which monitors the trade in wildlife worldwide. There are now over 16 TRAFFIC offices around the world which have played a major role in documenting and curbing illegal animal trade. In 1974 she created the IUCN-SSC Otter Specialist Group for the International Union of Conservation for Nature. Today the Group has over 300 members dedicated to global otter conservation.

Duplaix lives in Oregon and is a senior instructor at Oregon State University's Department of Fisheries and Wildlife.

References

External links
Personal website
Nicole Duplaix, Department of Fisheries and Wildlife, Oregon State University
IUCN/SSC Otter Specialist Group website

1943 births
Living people
21st-century American biologists
French zoologists
University of Paris alumni
French women biologists
Women zoologists
20th-century American women scientists
American zoologists
American women biologists
20th-century French women
French emigrants to the United States
21st-century American women scientists